Lafayette County is a county in the U.S. state of Mississippi. At the 2020 census, the population was 55,813. Its county seat is Oxford. The local pronunciation of the name is "la-FAY-et." The county's name honors Marquis de Lafayette, a French military hero and American general who fought during the American Revolutionary War.

The Oxford, MS Micropolitan Statistical Area includes all of Lafayette County. The county is policed by the Lafayette County Sheriff's Department.

Lafayette County is often regarded as the inspiration for Yoknapatawpha County, the fictional setting of many of William Faulkner's works.

Geography

Major highways

  U.S. Route 278
  Mississippi Highway 6
  Mississippi Highway 7
  Mississippi Highway 9W
  Mississippi Highway 30
  Mississippi Highway 315
  Mississippi Highway 331
  Mississippi Highway 334

Adjacent counties
 Marshall County (north)
 Union County (northeast)
 Pontotoc County (southeast)
 Calhoun County (south)
 Yalobusha County (southwest)
 Panola County (west)
 Tate County (northwest)

National protected area
 Holly Springs National Forest (part)

Demographics

2020 census

As of the 2020 United States Census, there were 55,813 people, 18,721 households, and 11,111 families residing in the county.

2010 Census

As of the census of 2010, there were 45,859  people. There were 21,646 housing units. The medium age was 26.8 years old. The racial makeup of the county was 71.5% white, 23.9% Black or African American, 0.3% Native American, and 2.0% Asian. 2.3% of the population were Hispanic or Latino of any race.

2000 Census

As of the census of 2000, there were 38,744 people, 14,373 households, and 8,321 families residing in the county.  The population density was 61 people per square mile (24/km2).  There were 16,587 housing units at an average density of 26 per square mile (10/km2).  The racial makeup of the county was 71.85% White, 25.05% Black or African American, 0.16% Native American, 1.67% Asian, 0.01% Pacific Islander, 0.42% from other races, and 0.84% from two or more races.  1.10% of the population were Hispanic or Latino of any race.

The largest European ancestry groups in Lafayette county are:
 13.4% English
 12.5% Irish
 9.1% German
 4.4% Scots-Irish
 2.8% Scottish
 1.1% Polish
 1.0% Welsh

Many people in Mississippi may claim Irish ancestry because of the term "Scots-Irish", but most of the time in Mississippi this term is used for those with Ulster Scots roots rather than Irish Catholics.

In 2000, there were 14,373 households, out of which 26.90% had children under the age of 18 living with them, 43.20% were married couples living together, 11.40% had a female householder with no husband present, and 42.10% were non-families. 29.10% of all households were made up of individuals, and 7.80% had someone living alone who was 65 years of age or older.  The average household size was 2.36 and the average family size was 2.97.

In the county, the population was spread out, with 19.50% under the age of 18, 27.10% from 18 to 24, 26.30% from 25 to 44, 17.10% from 45 to 64, and 9.80% who were 65 years of age or older.  The median age was 27 years. For every 100 females there were 96.70 males.  For every 100 females age 18 and over, there were 94.60 males.

The median income for a household in the county was $28,517, and the median income for a family was $42,910. Males had a median income of $30,964 versus $21,207 for females. The per capita income for the county was $16,406.  About 10.20% of families and 21.30% of the population were below the poverty line, including 15.60% of those under age 18 and 19.40% of those age 65 or over.

Communities

City 
 Oxford (county seat and largest municipality)

Town 
 Abbeville
 Taylor

Census-designated places
 Paris
 Tula
 University

Unincorporated communities
 Denmark
 Harmontown
 Springdale
 Yocona

Ghost towns
 Dogtown
 Orwood
 Riverside

Politics
Unlike many counties dominated by college towns, Lafayette County tilts Republican. It last supported a Democrat for president in 1980. However, it is not as heavily Republican as other counties in north Mississippi, particularly those in the Memphis area. The Democrats have received at least 40 percent of the vote in every election since 1988, a period when much of north Mississippi swung hard to the GOP.

Law enforcement

The Lafayette County Sheriff's Department is the law enforcement agency responsible for the policing and maintenance of public order of Lafayette County, Mississippi. They are also the primary law enforcement agency for all locales excluding Oxford, and work in tandem with the Oxford Police Department and The University of Mississippi's University Police Department in those jurisdictions. Responsible for maintenance and administration of its jail, the Lafayette County Detention Center in Oxford, it is also their duty to stand as guards of Lafayette County's County and Chancery Courts. In September 2018 the department employed 26 full-time deputies, in addition to other staff employed as guards for the county jail. In comparison, Oxford Police Department, which patrols a small fraction of the area done by the Sheriff's Department, employs over 75 full-time officers. 

F.D. "Buddy" East was the long-time sheriff, who held the office from 1972 until his death in September 2018, having been elected to twelve terms as sheriff. At the time he was the longest serving Sheriff in the history of the United States, having held the position for 46 years. The sheriff's son, Joey East, was concurrently the Oxford Police Department's Chief of Police. After the November 2019 elections, Joey East became the sheriff of Lafayette County, following his father.

Education
School districts include Lafayette County School District and Oxford School District.

University of Mississippi is in the county.

Northwest Mississippi Community College operates the Lafayette-Yalobusha Technical Center.

See also
 National Register of Historic Places listings in Lafayette County, Mississippi
 University of Mississippi (Ole Miss)

References

External links
 Lafayette County Records (MUM00256) owned by the University of Mississippi, Archives and Special Collections.

 
Mississippi counties
1836 establishments in Mississippi
Populated places established in 1836